James Mortimer may refer to:
 James Mortimer (chess player) (1833–1911), American/British chess player, journalist, and playwright
 James Mortimer (dogshow judge) (1842–1915), British dogshow judge
 Jim Mortimer (1921–2013), British trade unionist and General Secretary of the Labour Party
 William James Mortimer (died 2010), publisher, president and editor of the Deseret News
 James Mortimer (hurdler) (born 1983), New Zealand hurdler
 James Mortimer, a character in The Hound of the Baskervilles